The Polytech Orchestra is a symphony orchestra based in Otaniemi, Espoo.

It was founded in 1922 and is thus the oldest Finnish academic student orchestra. The conductor of the orchestra is currently James S. Kahane. There are about 100 active musicians at the PO, most of whom are students from Aalto University and other universities and schools within the greater Helsinki area.

PO's annual concert program includes autumn, Christmas and spring concerts in the Helsinki metropolitan area and a spring tour to various parts of Finland. The orchestra has also performed abroad in Germany, Hungary, Czech Republic, the Baltic States, Sweden and Scotland. The PO concert program is complemented by various charity and subscription concerts, such as the Printempo Concert at the Aalto University's alongside other music communities (Dominante, The Polytech Choir, Retuperän WBK, Boston Promenade, Polirytmi, Humpsvakar, the Helsinki Academic Male Choir KYL and the Helsinki Academic Female Choir KYN). The orchestra includes as well several smaller bands, such as their string quartets, the horn quartet Cornostar and the Polytechnic's Salon Orchestra.

Conductors 

 Eero Saari, 1922–23
 Eero Koskimies, 1923–35
 Sulho Ranta, 1935–39
 Heikki Aaltoila, 1940–56
 Aarre Hemming, 1956–58
 Jorma Panula, 1958–60
 Pentti Antila, 1964–66
 Kari Tikka, 1966–68
 Seppo Laamanen, 1968–69
 Ylermi Poijärvi, 1970–73
 Atso Almila, 1975–79
 Ari Rasilainen, 1979–81
 Timo Pulakka, 1982–83
 Juhani Lamminmäki, 1983–86
 Juha Nikkola, 1987–1990
 Sakari Oramo, 1990–92
 Hannu Norjanen, 1992–99, 2003
 Dima Slobodeniouk, 1999–2002
 Eva Ollikainen, 2003–05
 Petri Komulainen, 2005–2013
 Andreas Vogelsberger, 2013–2016
 Eero Lehtimäki, 2016–2018
 James S. Kahane, 2018–

Recordings 
 Teekkarimarsseja (1937) (produced by the Polytech Orchestra and Choir, ODEON record company)
 75 Years Celebration of the Polytech Orchestra (1997)
 Tree Time (1997) (Collaboration with Dominante Choir)
 Polyphony (1998) (Humorous concert with other TKY music associations)
 Sibelius recording (2000)
 Tupsahdus recording (2002) (Humorous concert with other TKY music associations)
 Ouverture solennelle 1812 (by Pyotr Tchaikovsky; recording at the Kallio Church 9/2002)
 Nordgren recording (2005)

See also 
 Helsinki University Symphony Orchestra

External links 
 

Symphony orchestras
Finnish orchestras
Music in Helsinki
Musical groups established in 1922